Rottweil (Alemannic: Rautweil) is a town in southwest Germany in the state of Baden-Württemberg. Rottweil was a free imperial city for nearly 600 years.

Located between the Black Forest and the Swabian Alps, Rottweil has nearly 25,000 inhabitants as of 2020. The town is famous for its medieval center and for its traditional carnival (called "Fasnet" in the local Swabian dialect). It is the oldest town in Baden-Württemberg, and its appearance has changed very little since the 16th century.

The town gives its name to the Rottweiler dog breed.

History 

Rottweil was founded by the Romans in AD 73 as Arae Flaviae and became a municipium, but there are traces of human settlement going back to 2000 BC. Roman baths and an Orpheus mosaic of c. AD 180 date from the time of Roman settlement. The present town became a ducal and a royal court before 771 and in 1268 it became a free imperial city.

In 1463 Rottweil joined the Swiss Confederacy under the pretence of a temporary alliance. In 1476 the Rottweilers fought on the Swiss side against Charles the Bold in the Battle of Morat. In 1512, Pope Julius II gave the city a valuable "Julius banner" for its services in the 1508–1510 "Great Pavier Campaign" to expel the French. In 1519, the Rottweilers left the old Swiss alliance. They joined a new one in which their membership was extended indefinitely – the so-called "Eternal Covenant".

Rottweil thus became a centre of the Swiss Confederation. The relations between the Swiss Confederation and Rottweil cooled rapidly during the Protestant Reformation. When Rottweil was troubled by wars, however, it still asked the Confederates for help.

In the Rottweil Witch Hunts from 1546 to 1661, 266 so-called witches, wizards and magicians were executed in the imperial city of Rottweil. On April 15, 2015, they were given a posthumous pardon. An official apology was given by the City Council about 400 years after their violent deaths.

Rottweil lost both its status as free city and its alliance with the Swiss Confederacy with the conquest of the region by Napoleon in 1803.

Lord mayors since the 19th century 
 1820–1833: Max Joseph von Khuon, Schultheiß
 1833–1845: Max Teufel
 1845–1848: Karl Dinkelmann
 1848–1851: Kaspar Rapp
 1852–1887: Johann Baptist Marx
 1887–1923: Edwin Glückher
 1924–1943: Josef Abrell
 1943–1944: Otto Mann
 1944–1945: Paul Fritz
 1945–1946: Franz Mederle
 1946–1965: Arnulf Gutknecht
 1965–1985: Ulrich Regelmann, mayor; from 1970 Lord Mayor
 1985–2001: Michael Arnold
 2001–2009: Thomas Engeser
 2009–2022: Ralf Broß
2022–present: Christian Ruf

Economy 
During the Middle Ages, Rottweil used to be a flourishing imperial city with great economic and cultural influence. In 1868, Rottweil was connected to Stuttgart by rail, which boosted the economy of the region.

Today, most companies in Rottweil are either small or medium sized. A trading and shopping town with a high level of innovation that benefits from its well developed educational and transport infrastructure, Rottweil has many industrial companies and a steadily growing proportion of knowledge-intensive service jobs.

At 7.9%, Rottweil has one of the highest academic rates in the region.

Media 
Local events in Rottweil are reported in the daily newspaper Schwarzwälder Bote, the Stadtanzeiger, online and once a week in the print edition , the TV station  and the local radio station , which is based in the district.

Notable former companies 
 Moker
 
 Peter-Uhren
 Rhodia
 
 Brauerei Pflug

Infrastructure

Road traffic 
By car, Rottweil can be reached via the Bundesautobahn 81 Stuttgart-Singen, exit Rottweil. The city lies on the Bundesstraße 27 between Schaffhausen and Stuttgart, on the Bundesstraße 14, which runs from Stockach on Lake Constance via Tuttlingen to Rottweil and on via Horb am Neckar to Stuttgart, and on the Bundesstraße 462 from Rottweil through the Black Forest to Freudenstadt and Rastatt.

Bicycle traffic 
Rottweil is located on the  along the Neckar River via Horb, Tübingen, Stuttgart, Heilbronn and Heidelberg to Mannheim.

Air traffic 

The nearest commercial airports are Stuttgart Airport and Zurich Airport.

Education 
Rottweil has three Gymnasien (Albertus-Magnus-Gymnasium, Droste-Hülshoff-Gymnasium, Leibniz-Gymnasium), one Realschule, one Förderschule (Achert-Schule), three Grundschulen (Eichendorff-Grundschule, Grundschule Neufra and Grundschule Neukirch), and four Hauptschulen (GHS Göllsdorf, Johanniter-Grund- und Hauptschule, Konrad-Witz-Grund- und Hauptschule and Römer-Grund- und Hauptschule).

Main sights 
 The late-Romanesque and Gothic–era Münster Heiliges Kreuz ("Minster of the Holy Cross"), built over a pre-existing church from 1270. It features a crucifix by Veit Stoss and noteworthy Gothic sculptures.
 Kapellenkirche (1330–1340), a Gothic church with a tower and with three statue-decorated portals
 Lorenzkapelle ("Church of St. Lawrence", 16th century) in late Gothic style. It houses some two hundred works by Swabian masters and Gothic altarpieces from the 14th and 15th centuries.
 The town's museum, including a notable Roman mosaic with the legend of Orpheus
 The late-Gothic town hall (1521)
 St. Pelagius, a Romanesque church from the 12th century. Excavations have brought to light Roman baths on the same site.
 Dominican Museum of Rottweil – local branch of the Landesmuseum Württemberg
 As of 2015, ThyssenKrupp was constructing a $45 million,  tower, the Rottweil Test Tower. The tower is a research facility for the company and is to be used to test new elevator cars and technologies. When the tower was completed in 2017, it was the tallest elevator test tower in the world. The windowless building is to have 12 elevator shafts.

Twin towns – sister cities

Rottweil is twinned with:
 L'Aquila, Italy
 Brugg, Switzerland
 Hyères, France
 Imst, Austria

Notable people
Konrad Witz (1400/10–1445/46), painter
Adam of Rottweil, 15th-century scholar and printer
Franz Xavier Wernz (1842–1914), Superior General of the Society of Jesus
Erwin Teufel (born 1939), politician (CDU), former minister president of Baden-Württemberg
Rüdiger Safranski (born 1945), writer and literary scholar
Matthias Hölle (born 1951), opera bass
Anne Haigis (born 1955), musician and singer
Wolfgang Stryi (1957–2005), jazz musician
Andreas Schwab (born 1973), politician (CDU) and member of the European Parliament
Johannes Erath (born 1975), opera director 
Christoph Burkard (born 1983), Paralympic swimmer
Maximiliane Rall (born 1993), footballer
Joshua Kimmich (born 1995), footballer

Trivia
 The Rottweiler dog breed is named after this town; it used to be a butcher's dog in the region.
 "Das Mädchen aus Rottweil" is a song by the German band Die Toten Hosen.

Gallery

See also

 Rottweil (district)
 Synagoge Rottweil

Notes

References

External links

 
Feast of Fools: Medieval Carnival Celebrations in Rottweil
History and territory of the former Reichsstadt Rottweil
Pictures of and stories about Rottweil

Towns in Baden-Württemberg
Rottweil (district)
Associates of the Old Swiss Confederacy
Former states and territories of Baden-Württemberg
Germania Superior
Free imperial cities
Former republics
States and territories established in 1140
States and territories disestablished in 1802
Populated places on the Neckar basin
Populated riverside places in Germany
Württemberg